HMS Umpire was a modified Admiralty  destroyer which served with the Royal Navy.  The Modified R class added attributes of the Yarrow Later M class to improve the capability of the ships to operate in bad weather. Launched on 9 June 1917, the ship operated with the Grand Fleet during World War I as an escort to a squadron of light cruiser and took part in the Second Battle of Heligoland Bight. After the Armistice, the vessel continued to serve and gained fame when, after rescuing the charity's founder from drowning in 1924, the name of the first house opened by what would become Veterans Aid was named H10 after the destroyer's pennant number. Umpire was sold to be broken up in 1930.

Design and description

Umpire was one of eleven modified  destroyers ordered by the British Admiralty in March 1916 as part of the Eighth War Construction Programme. The design was a development of the existing R class, adding features from the Yarrow Later M class which had been introduced based on wartime experience. The forward two boilers were transposed and vented through a single funnel, enabling the bridge and forward gun to be placed further aft. Combined with hull-strengthening, this improved the destroyers' ability to operate at high speed in bad weather.

Two funnels were fitted.

Armament consisted of three single  Mk V QF guns on the ship's centreline, with one on the forecastle, one aft on a raised platform and one between the funnels. A single 2-pounder  "pom-pom anti-aircraft gun was carried on a platform between two twin mounts for  torpedoes. The ship had a complement of 82 officers and ratings.

Service
Umpire was launched on 9 June 1917 by William Doxford & Sons of Sunderland.  The vessel was named after the umpire in the game of cricket. On commissioning in August that year, the ship joined the Thirteenth Destroyer Flotilla of the Grand Fleet and served there to the end of the conflict.

The vessel formed part of the escort for the Sixth Light Cruiser Squadron based at Rosyth. On 15 October, the destroyer accompanied the Sixth Light Cruiser Squadron in an attack on German minesweepers with aircraft carrier . No enemy ships were sunk. On the following day, Umpire took part in the Second Battle of Heligoland Bight in support of the First Cruiser Squadron, led by Vice-Admiral Trevylyan Napier. The vessel also rescued aviation pioneer Jack McCleery when he ditched his aircraft on 24 September 1918.

When the Grand Fleet was disbanded, Umpire was transferred to the Fifth Destroyer Flotilla of the Home Fleet, under the flag of  However, as the Royal Navy returned to a peacetime level of strength, both the number of ships and the amount of personnel needed to be reduced to save money. The destroyer was recommissioned in reserve on 23 October 1919. The ship continued to serve and, while operating in Malta on 2 November 1924, Umpire rescued Gwendolin Huggins, who later went on to found Veterans Aid. She named the charity's first house H10 in honour of the ship. On 21 September 1928, the ship escorted the Sultan of Muscat to a naval demonstration. However, soon after, the destroyer was decommissioned and sold on 7 January 1930 to Metal Industries to be broken up in Charlestown.

Pennant numbers

References

Bibliography
 
 
 
 
 
 
 
 
 
 
 
 

1917 ships
R-class destroyers (1916)
Ships built on the River Wear
World War I destroyers of the United Kingdom